Sarah Renee De Bono (born 6 March 1992) is an Australian singer-songwriter and pianist, born and raised in Melbourne. She participated on the first season of The Voice (Australia), coming in fourth place. Shortly after she signed a record deal with Universal Music Australia. On 24 June 2012, De Bono scored her first top 10 hit with "Beautiful", co-written and produced by Jhay C peaking at number four on the ARIA Singles Chart and was certified gold. Her debut album No Shame was released on 13 July 2012, which contained songs she performed on The Voice, as well as newly recorded covers. The album debuted at number seven on the ARIA Albums Chart.

Life and career

Early life
De Bono grew up in the working-class suburb of Broadmeadows in Melbourne. She also worked as a singing teacher in a school in North Fawkner, Melbourne. In 2007 she won the Brimbank Idol competition after placing second in 2006.

2012: The Voice Australia

De Bono auditioned for the first season of The Voice (Australia) and finished in fourth place. After coming in fourth, De Bono received support from her coach Joel Madden and his wife Nicole Richie. De Bono's placing received uproar from fans and viewers.

Performances

2012–present: Record deal, No Shame and upcoming second studio album
On 25 June 2012, De Bono's original song "Beautiful", which she debuted on The Voice, charted at number four on the ARIA Singles Chart and was certified gold by the Australian Recording Industry Association (ARIA), for sales of 35,000 copies. Two days later, it was revealed that De Bono had signed a record deal with Universal Music Australia. Her debut single "No Shame", which would have been her winner's single, was released digitally on 29 June 2012. That same day, it was announced that De Bono will be a supporting act for Kelly Clarkson's Australian leg of her Stronger Tour in late September to early October 2012. De Bono's debut album, also titled No Shame, was released on 13 July 2012, which features studio versions of covers she performed on The Voice, original songs, as well as newly recorded covers of Usher's "Burn" and Duffy's "Warwick Avenue". The album debuted at number seven on the ARIA Albums Chart. On 14 August 2012, De Bono revealed to The Daily Telegraph that she was working on her second studio album and hopes to release as early next year. On the new album's direction she said; "I know what I want to write about, it’s just putting those ideas into melodies. It’s going to be fun and uplifting,".

Discography

Studio albums

Singles

Promotional singles

Tours 
Supporting act
2012: Stronger Tour (Kelly Clarkson)

References

External links

Living people
Australian singer-songwriters
Musicians from Melbourne
Australian singers of Italian descent
The Voice (Australian TV series) contestants
Universal Music Group artists
Bono, Sarah De
1992 births
21st-century Australian singers
21st-century Australian women singers
Australian women singer-songwriters
People from Broadmeadows, Victoria